One Shot Deal is an album by Frank Zappa, posthumously released in June 2008.

Overview
The track "Occam's Razor" is a guitar solo extract from a live version of the song "Inca Roads".  The solo was used in the song "On the Bus" from the album Joe's Garage (1979).  This is an example of Zappa's xenochrony technique. Tracks 3 and 9 feature the Abnuceals Emuukha Electric Symphony Orchestra.

Track listing 
All songs written by Frank Zappa except where noted.

Personnel 
 "Bathtub Man"
 Frank Zappa – guitar
 Napoleon Murphy Brock – vocals, saxophone
 George Duke – keyboards, vocals
 Tom Fowler – bass
 Chester Thompson – drums
 Ruth Underwood – percussion
 "Space Boogers"
 Frank Zappa – guitar
 George Duke – keyboards
 Chester Thompson – drums 
 "Hermitage"
 Frank Zappa – guitar, composer
 Ralph Grierson, Mike Lang, Ian Underwood – keyboards
 Bill Mays – clavinet
 Bobby Dubow, John Wittenberg – violin
 Pamela Goldsmith – viola
 Jerry Kessler – cello
 Lou Anne Neill – harp
 Dave Shostac – flute, tenor sax
 Gary Foster – 2nd flute (and doubles)
 Ray Reed – flute, alto sax
 Vic Morosco – clarinet, alto sax
 Jay Migliori – clarinet, tenor sax
 Mike Altschul – bass clarinet, baritone sax
 Earle Dumler – oboe, English horn, bass oboe
 John Winter – oboe, English horn
 David Sherr – 2nd oboe and tenor saxophone
 JoAnn Caldwell – bassoon
 Bobby Tricarico – bassoon, contra bassoon
 Gene Goe, Malcolm McNab, Roy Poper – trumpet
 Arthur Briegleb, David Duke, Bob Henderson, Todd Miller – French horn
 Jock Ellis, Bruce Fowler, Kenny Shroyer – trombone
 Dana Hughes – bass trombone
 Don Waldrop – tuba and contrabass trombone
 Dave Parlato – bass
 Terry Bozzio – drums
 Alan Estes, John Bergamo, Emil Richards, Tom Raney – percussion
 "Trudgin' Across the Tundra"
 Frank Zappa – conductor, guitar
 Tony Duran – slide guitar
 Earle Dumler – oboe, saxophone, sarrusophone
 Malcolm McNab – trumpet
 Gary Barone – trumpet (solo)
 Tom Malone – trumpet, trombone, tuba, piccolo, saxophone
 Bruce Fowler – trombone
 Glenn Ferris – trombone
 Dave Parlato – bass
 Jim Gordon – drums, steel drums 
 "Occam's Razor"
 Frank Zappa – guitar solo
 Warren Cuccurullo – guitar
 Denny Walley – guitar, backing vocal
 Tommy Mars – keyboards
 Peter Wolf – keyboards
 Arthur Barrow – bass
 Vinnie Colaiuta – drums
 Ed Mann – percussion
 Ike Willis – backing vocal
 "Heidelberg"
 Frank Zappa – guitar solo
 Adrian Belew – guitar
 Tommy Mars – keyboards
 Peter Wolf – keyboards
 Patrick O'Hearn – bass
 Terry Bozzio – drums
 Ed Mann – percussion
 "The Illinois Enema Bandit"
 Frank Zappa – guitar, vocals
 Ray White – vocals, guitar
 Steve Vai – guitar
 Tommy Mars – keyboards
 Robert Martin – keyboards, vocals
 Scott Thunes – bass
 Chad Wackerman – drums
 Ed Mann – percussion
 "Australian Yellow Snow"
 Frank Zappa – guitar, vocals
 George Duke – keyboards, vocals
 Jean-Luc Ponty – violin
 Ian Underwood – woodwinds, synthesizer
 Sal Marquez – trumpet, vocals
 Bruce Fowler – trombone
 Tom Fowler – bass
 Ralph Humphrey – drums
 Ruth Underwood – percussion
 "Rollo"
 Same as song 3. "Hermitage"

Credits 
 Bernie Grundman – mastering
 Michael Mesker – design, layout design
 Melanie Starks – production coordination
 Joe Travers – producer, vault research
 Gail Zappa – producer, package concept, text

References

External links 
 The Official Frank Zappa Site

Live albums published posthumously
Frank Zappa live albums
2008 live albums
Zappa Records albums